Andrei Viktorovich Panfyorov (born 2 November 1980) is a Russian former professional footballer.

Club career
He made his debut in the Russian Premier League in 1998 for FC Torpedo Moscow.

Honours
 Latvian Higher League runner-up: 2004.

References

1980 births
Living people
Russian footballers
Russian Premier League players
FC Torpedo Moscow players
FC Torpedo-2 players
FC Kryvbas Kryvyi Rih players
FK Liepājas Metalurgs players
Russian expatriate footballers
Expatriate footballers in Latvia
Expatriate footballers in Ukraine
FC Volgar Astrakhan players
Ukrainian Premier League players
FC SKA-Khabarovsk players
FC Arsenal Tula players

Association football midfielders